The Majuba Mountains are a mountain range in Pershing County, Nevada.

The Majuba placer has produced impressive gold specimens.

References 

Mountain ranges of Nevada
Mountain ranges of Pershing County, Nevada